H80 or H-80 can refer to :
MSL Aero H80, a French ultralight aircraft
General Electric H80, a turboprop aircraft engine
HMS Brazen (H80),  a B-class destroyer built for the Royal Navy circa 1930